The 2015–16 season was F.C. Motagua's 69th season in existence and the club's 50th consecutive season in the top fight of Honduran football.

Overview
This season, the club were looking for its 14th league and 2nd domestic cup; as well as it first CONCACAF Champions League.  On 7 July, former president Eduardo Atala took charge of the club for his second term after Julio Gutiérrez was forced to resign due to legal matters.  On 20 October, a 1–1 draw against Club América meant an early elimination from the 2015–16 CONCACAF Champions League.  The Apertura tournament ended with the silver medal when they lost to C.D. Honduras Progreso on penalty shoot-outs after a 4–4 aggregated score in 210 minutes of play.  For the Clausura tournament, the club announced that they will be playing all their home games on Saturdays in the evening, instead of the traditional Sundays in the afternoon; seeking for a better response from their local fans.  On 31 December, Uruguayan newspaper Ovación Digital announced the results of the annual survey which decides the best teams, players and managers of each Latin American country for 2015, and Motagua, was selected as the best 2015 team in Honduras.  For their second season in a row, the team was unsuccessful on conquering the Honduran Cup as they lost to Juticalpa F.C. in the quarterfinals.  In the Clausura tournament, they were unable to qualify to their fourth consecutive final under Diego Vásquez's management when they fall short in the semifinals against city rivals Club Deportivo Olimpia.

Players

Transfers in

Transfers out

Squad
 Statistics as of 15 May 2016
 Only league matches into account

Results

Preseason and friendlies

Apertura

Clausura

Honduran Cup

Honduran Supercup

CONCACAF Champions League

External links
 Official website

References

F.C. Motagua seasons
Motagua
Motagua